Laura García may refer to:

 Laura García Benítez (born 1981), Spanish Paralympic judoka
 Laura García Dávila (born 1968), Mexican politician
 Laura Garcia Martinez (born 1991), Spanish trampolinist at the 2010 Trampoline World Championships
 Laura García-Caro (born 1995), Spanish racewalker
 Laura García-Godoy, Dominican Republic actress
 Laura Gallego García (born 1977), Spanish author